JewishGen is a non-profit organization founded in 1987 as an international electronic resource for Jewish genealogy. In 2003, JewishGen became an affiliate of the Museum of Jewish Heritage – A Living Memorial to the Holocaust in New York City. It provides amateur and professional genealogists with the tools to research their Jewish family history and heritage.

History 

JewishGen was founded in 1987 by Susan E. King in Houston, Texas, as a Fidonet bulletin board with approximately 150 users interested in Jewish genealogy. To access the bulletin board, users dialed into the connection via telephones. Annual donations of $25 were requested to fund the service.

Around 1989 to 1990, JewishGen moved to the internet as a mailing list and online forum, and was called the Jewish Genealogy Conference.  It was loosely managed by founding members and volunteers that included Warren Blatt, Susan E. King, Bernie Kouchel, Gary Mokotoff, Michael Tobias, and others active in the community. JewishGen had a website by 1995.

At the end of 2002, King announced that in 2003 JewishGen became an affiliate of the Museum of Jewish Heritage. In 2005, the International Association of Jewish Genealogical Societies (IAJGS) gave King an IAJGS Achievement Award for her work with JewishGen, citing the organization's worldwide impact. In March 2008, King retired, and JewishGen moved their administrative office to the museum's facilities.

In 2008, in a partnership with JewishGen, Ancestry.com took over the data center hosting of the JewishGen computerized assets. The agreement improved the JewishGen website's performance, which had been problematic, and created a licensing agreement with Ancestry.com for database access that created a revenue stream for JewishGen. The partnership increases Ancestry.com's access to and integration of Jewish genealogical resources from JewishGen.

JewishGen's website is designed to provide a simple and easy interface, and is offered as a free public service. Over 1,000 active volunteers throughout the world contribute to its ever-growing collection of databases, resources, and search tools. It lists more than 21 million Jewish records, hundreds of translated yizkor (memorial) books, research tools, a family finder, educational classes, historical components, and other resources. It has a user base of over 500,000 registered users worldwide.

Databases 
 JewishGen Family Finder (JGFF): a compilation of surnames and towns currently being researched by over 100,000 Jewish genealogists worldwide.  It contains over 500,000 entries, including 140,000 ancestral surnames and 18,000 town names, and is indexed and cross-referenced by both surname and town name.  The Family Finder, like JewishGen's other databases, uses Daitch–Mokotoff Soundex, Beider-Morse Phonetic Matching and Damerau–Levenshtein distance fuzzy technology to yield results on all the different spellings of the name being searched.  It connects users who are researching the same surnames and towns.
 Family Tree of the Jewish People (FTJP):  a database of Jewish family trees. The central purpose of the FTJP is to enhance Jews' ability to connect and re-connect their families and to increase interest in Jewish genealogy.
 JewishGen Gazetteer: (formerly the "ShtetlSeeker") a database containing the names of all localities in 54 countries in Europe, North Africa, and the Middle East. The data is based on the U.S. Board on Geographic Names databases and contains more than 3 million names.  
 JewishGen Communities Database:  contains information on over 6,000 Jewish communities in Europe, North Africa and the Middle East, together with Jewish population figures, historical town names and jurisdictions, inset maps, and links to JewishGen resources.
 JewishGen Online Worldwide Burial Registry (JOWBR): a database of names and other identifying information from cemeteries and burial records worldwide. Contains more than three million burial records from 7,300 cemeteries in 128 countries, as of January 2018.
 JewishGen's Holocaust Database: a collection of databases containing information about Holocaust victims and survivors.  It currently contains more than 2.75 million entries, including concentration-camp lists, transport lists, ghetto records, census lists, and ID cards.

All country databases 
JewishGen's All Country Databases contain historical records, including birth, marriage and death records, census records, military records with new data added regularly. Country databases currently exist for the following areas:

 JewishGen Austria-Czech Database
 JewishGen Belarus Database
 JewishGen Canada Database
 JewishGen France Database
 JewishGen Germany Database
 JewishGen Hungary Database
 JewishGen Latvia Database
 JewishGen Lithuania Database
 All Poland Database —in partnership with JRI-Poland
 JewishGen Romania Database —includes Romania and Moldova
 JewishGen Scandinavia Database
 JewishGen Ukraine Database
  United Kingdom Database —in partnership with Jewish Genealogical Society of Great Britain (JGSGB)  
 JewishGen USA Database

Resources and research tools 
 Yizkor Books: Translates Yizkor Books, predominantly written after the Holocaust, into English. There are currently hundreds of completed or partially completed translated books online.
 KehilaLinks: Creates "virtual" Yizkor Books online, by creating specific pages for towns and uploading information such as pictures, maps, personal recollections, and research data.
 Family Pages: Allows family researchers to create their own webpage for free in order to help connect with relatives and learn about their history.
 ViewMate: Allow users to post photographs and documents online, and request help in translating or identifying information.
 JewishGen Discussion Groups: Provide researchers with the opportunity to connect, ask questions, exchange information and learn from others.  Discussion groups are categorized by general and specific areas/topics of interest.
 Special Interest Groups: Web pages and organized groups for Special Interest Group (SIGs) that focus on common geographic regions of origin or special topics.

Education 
 Beginner Pages: Web pages that explain the basics of Jewish genealogy and how to navigate JewishGen.
 JewishGen Education Center: Online interactive courses in Jewish genealogy to help researchers learn methodology, research techniques and organization of information for proper analysis.

See also 
 Avotaynu
 Dor Yeshorim - Committee for Prevention of Jewish Genetic Diseases
 Gesher Galicia
 IAJGS
 Where Once We Walked

References

External links 
 
 Museum of Jewish Heritage

Genealogical societies
Jewish genealogy
Jewish organizations based in the United States
Non-profit organizations based in New York City
Jewish organizations